Traverse Bay may refer to a number of articles relating to the geography of the Great Lakes region:

Bays 
Lake Michigan

 Grand Traverse Bay
 East (Arm) Grand Traverse Bay
 West (Arm) Grand Traverse Bay
 Little Traverse Bay

Lake Superior

 Grand Traverse Bay (Lake Superior)
 Little Traverse Bay (Lake Superior)

Other 

 Traverse Bay Blues Rugby Football Club
 Traverse Bay Area Intermediate School District
 Traverse Bay Area Career Tech Center

See also 

 Traverse (disambiguation)

Disambiguation pages
Great Lakes